The Family is the seventh studio album by American boy band Brockhampton. It was released on November 17, 2022, through RCA and Question Everything. The release of a final album during 2022 was announced during the band's performance at the 2022 Coachella festival. The Family was thought to be this final studio album, and was advertised as such, until the announcement of TM in a promo image that was released alongside The Family.

Background 
In January 2022, Brockhampton announced their disbandment via social media, which was to follow their scheduled performances at O2 Academy Brixton and Coachella. During their performance at Coachella on April 16, 2022, they announced a then unnamed final album, to be released in the same year. Two days later, the video projected during the performance would be released to their YouTube page, titled "Message from Brockhampton".

Promotion 
In October 2022, Brockhampton created a private Instagram user named @imissthebandalready. An image of the unfollowed state of this page would be reposted on the band's official Instagram page's story in the latter half of October.

On October 27, 2022, Brockhampton posted a one-minute video titled "I Miss the Band Already" to their YouTube and Instagram pages, teasing a final album announcement. In the comments of the Instagram video, Kevin Abstract stated that there would be a follow-up in "one hour..." As such, an hour later, an album teaser for The Family was released to their YouTube and Instagram pages, announcing a release date of November 17, 2022, and the album cover was posted to their various social media accounts.

On November 4, 2022, "Big Pussy" was released as the first single from The Family. On November 11, "The Ending" was released as the second single from the album.

On November 16, 2022, Brockhampton posted a final teaser for the album titled "It All Comes Out In The Wash" to their YouTube and Instagram pages. One day later, on November 17 2022, the album released alongside a music video for the final single RZA.

Track listing

Samples
 "Take It Back" contains excerpts from "Miracle", written by Raymond A. Myles.
 "RZA" contains excerpts from "The Big Draft", written by Bruce Belland and Glen Larson.
 "Big Pussy" contains excerpts from "Victim", performed by The Germs, "Bulan", written by Mario Candido Rusca, "Love Is the Reason", written by William A. Keyes and samples from "Hustlin", performed by Smoothe Da Hustler.
 "All That" contains interpolation from "All That", written by Lisa Lopes and Arnold Hennings.
 "Southside" contains excerpts from "You Are So Brave (Funeral Dirge)".
 "Good Time" contains a sample of the recording "Jesus Is the World to Me", performed by Pastor T.L. Barrett and the Youth For Christ Choir.
 "37th" contains excerpts from "The Dark End of the Street", written by Chips Moman and Dan Penn.
 "Boyband" contains excerpts from "In God's Own Time (My Change Will Come)", written by John W. Hason.
 "The Family" contains excerpts from "New Day", written by Donald Breedlove and Napoleon Crayton, "September in the Rain", written by Al Dubin and Harry Warren, and samples from "New Day" by Band Of Thieves.
 "The Ending" contains excerpts from "Let Me Be the One Baby", performed by Willie Hutch.
 "Brockhampton" contains excerpts from "I Can't Fake It Anymore", performed by Ruby Winters.

Personnel

Production and arrangement
 Bearface – production (2–5, 10, 15, 17), additional production (1), executive production
 Boylife – production (6–9, 11–12, 14–17), additional production (1, 13), executive production
 Nick Velez – production (1, 4, 13), additional production (2–3, 14)

Musicians
 Kevin Abstract – lead vocals
 Bearface – additional vocals (13, 15), background vocals (11)
 Boylife – additional vocals (1, 6, 13, 16)
 RZA – additional vocals (2, 11)
 Caitlyn Harris – additional vocals (2, 5)
 No Rome – additional vocals (5)
 Vanessa "Nettie" Wood – additional vocals (9)
 Erik Shiboski – upright bass (4)
 "Robot" Scott Carter – piano (13), programming (13)

Technical personnel
 Bearface – recording (1–5, 10, 17)
 Boylife – recording (6–9, 11–16)
 Bob Power – mixing
 Honey Canin – mixing assistant
 Heba Kadry – mastering

Design
 No Tricks – art direction, design
 Chris Albo – art direction, design
 Leslie Qi – art direction, design
 Amanda Alborano – art direction, design

Charts

References 

2022 albums
Brockhampton (band) albums
RCA Records albums